Arthur Clark (born ) represented Dedham, Massachusetts in the Great and General Court. He was elected in  1900 at 22 years old and was the youngest member of the Massachusetts House of Representatives. He chose not to stand for reelection in 1902.

He attended the dedication of St. Mary's Church.

References

Members of the Massachusetts House of Representatives
Year of death missing
Year of birth uncertain